Heliophanus is a genus of the spider family Salticidae (jumping spiders). Most of the almost 170 described species occur in Africa, with many others found in the Palearctic region from Europe to Japan.

Species

, the World Spider Catalog accepted the following species:

 Heliophanus abditus Wesołowska, 1986 – Syria
 Heliophanus aberdarensis Wesołowska, 1986 – Kenya
 Heliophanus activus (Blackwall, 1877) – Seychelles
 Heliophanus acutissimus Wesołowska, 1986 – Algeria
 Heliophanus aeneus (Hahn, 1832) – Palearctic
 Heliophanus aethiopicus Wesołowska, 2003 – Ethiopia
 Heliophanus africanus Wesołowska, 1986 – South Africa
 Heliophanus agricola Wesołowska, 1986 – Algeria, Spain
 Heliophanus agricoloides Wunderlich, 1987 – Canary Islands
 Heliophanus alienus Wesołowska, 1986 – Cameroon
 Heliophanus anymphos Wesołowska, 2003 – Kenya
 Heliophanus apiatus Simon, 1868 – Spain to Italy
 Heliophanus auratus C. L. Koch, 1835 – Palearctic
 Heliophanus aviculus Berland & Millot, 1941 – Central, West Africa
 Heliophanus baicalensis Kulczynski, 1895 – Russia, Mongolia, China
 Heliophanus bellus Wesołowska, 1986 – South Africa
 Heliophanus berlandi Lawrence, 1937 – South Africa
 Heliophanus bisulcus Wesołowska, 1986 – South Africa
 Heliophanus bolensis Wesołowska, 2003 – Ethiopia
 Heliophanus brevis Wesołowska, 2003 – Ethiopia
 Heliophanus butemboensis Wesołowska, 1986 – Congo, Rwanda
 Heliophanus camtschadalicus Kulczynski, 1885 – Sweden, Russia
 Heliophanus canariensis Wesołowska, 1986 – Canary Islands
 Heliophanus capensis Wesołowska, 1986 – South Africa
 Heliophanus capicola Simon, 1901 – South Africa
 Heliophanus cassinicola Simon, 1909 – West, Central, East Africa
 Heliophanus charlesi Wesołowska, 2003 – South Africa
 Heliophanus chikangawanus Wesołowska, 1986 – Angola, Malawi
 Heliophanus chovdensis Prószynski, 1982 – Kazakhstan to Mongolia
 Heliophanus claviger Simon, 1901 – South Africa
 Heliophanus comorensis Dierkens, 2012 – Comoros, Mayotte
 Heliophanus congolensis Giltay, 1935 – Congo to São Tomé
 Heliophanus conspicuus Wesołowska, 1986 – Algeria
 Heliophanus creticus Giltay, 1932 – Crete
 Heliophanus crudeni Lessert, 1925 – Tanzania
 Heliophanus cupreus (Walckenaer, 1802) – Palearctic
 Heliophanus curvidens (O. P-Cambridge, 1872) – Israel to China
 Heliophanus cuspidatus Xiao, 2000 – China
 Heliophanus dampfi Schenkel, 1923 – Europe, Russia
 Heliophanus deamatus Peckham & Peckham, 1903 – Central, Southern Africa
 Heliophanus debilis Simon, 1901 – Central, East, Southern Africa
 Heliophanus decempunctatus (Caporiacco, 1941) – Ethiopia
 Heliophanus decoratus L. Koch, 1875 – North Africa, Israel
 Heliophanus deformis Wesołowska, 1986 – Angola
 Heliophanus demonstrativus Wesołowska, 1986 – East, Southern Africa
 Heliophanus deserticola Simon, 1901 – South Africa
 Heliophanus designatus (Peckham & Peckham, 1903) – South Africa
 Heliophanus difficilis Wesołowska, 1986 – Congo
 Heliophanus dubius C. L. Koch, 1835 – Palearctic
 Heliophanus dunini Rakov & Logunov, 1997 – Azerbaijan, Kazakhstan
 Heliophanus dux Wesołowska & van Harten, 1994 – Yemen
 Heliophanus edentulus Simon, 1871 – Mediterranean
 Heliophanus encifer Simon, 1871 – Mediterranean
 Heliophanus equester L. Koch, 1867 – Italy to Azerbaijan
 Heliophanus erythropleurus Kulczynski, 1901 – Ethiopia
 Heliophanus eucharis Simon, 1887 – Ivory Coast
 Heliophanus excentricus Ledoux, 2007 – Comoros, Mayotte, Réunion
 Heliophanus falcatus Wesołowska, 1986 – Congo, Angola
 Heliophanus fascinatus Wesołowska, 1986 – Sudan to Botswana
 Heliophanus feltoni Logunov, 2009 – Turkey
 Heliophanus flavipes (Hahn, 1832) – Palearctic
 Heliophanus forcipifer Kulczynski, 1895 – Central Asia
 Heliophanus fuerteventurae Schmidt & Krause, 1996 – Canary Islands
 Heliophanus furvus Wesołowska & Haddad, 2014 – Lesotho
 Heliophanus giltayi Lessert, 1933 – Kenya to Angola
 Heliophanus gladiator Wesołowska, 1986 – Kenya, Malawi
 Heliophanus glaucus Bösenberg & Lenz, 1895 – Egypt, Libya
 Heliophanus gloriosus Wesołowska, 1986 – Angola, Botswana
 Heliophanus gramineus Wesołowska & Haddad, 2013 – South Africa
 Heliophanus hamifer Simon, 1886 – Mozambique, Zimbabwe, Madagascar, Seychelles
 Heliophanus harpago Simon, 1910 – Central, West Africa
 Heliophanus hastatus Wesołowska, 1986 – South Africa
 Heliophanus haymozi Logunov, 2015 – Portugal, Spain
 Heliophanus heurtaultae Rollard & Wesołowska, 2002 – Guinea
 Heliophanus horrifer Wesołowska, 1986 – South Africa
 Heliophanus ibericus Wesołowska, 1986 – Spain
 Heliophanus imerinensis Simon, 1901 – Madagascar
 Heliophanus imperator Wesołowska, 1986 – Kenya, Malawi
 Heliophanus improcerus Wesołowska, 1986 – Congo
 Heliophanus infaustus (Peckham & Peckham, 1903) – East Africa, Zimbabwe
 Heliophanus innominatus Wesołowska, 1986 – Madagascar
 Heliophanus insperatus Wesołowska, 1986 – Angola, Zimbabwe, South Africa
 Heliophanus inversus Barrientos & Febrer, 2018 – Spain (Menorca) 
 Heliophanus iranus Wesołowska, 1986 – Iran
 Heliophanus jacksoni Wesołowska, 2011 – Kenya
 Heliophanus japonicus Kishida, 1910 – Japan
 Heliophanus kankanensis Berland & Millot, 1941 – Central, West Africa
 Heliophanus kenyaensis Wesołowska, 1986 – Central Africa
 Heliophanus kilimanjaroensis Wesołowska, 1986 – Tanzania
 Heliophanus kittenbergeri (Caporiacco, 1947) – Tanzania
 Heliophanus kochii Simon, 1868 – Palearctic
 Heliophanus koktas Logunov, 1992 – Kazakhstan
 Heliophanus konradthaleri Logunov, 2009 – Turkey
 Heliophanus kovacsi Wesołowska, 2003 – Ethiopia
 Heliophanus lawrencei Wesołowska, 1986 – Congo, Angola
 Heliophanus lesserti Wesołowska, 1986 – Central, Southern Africa
 Heliophanus leucopes Wesołowska, 2003 – Ethiopia
 Heliophanus lineiventris Simon, 1868 – Palearctic
 Heliophanus macentensis Berland & Millot, 1941 – Ivory Coast to Kenya
 Heliophanus machaerodus Simon, 1909 – North Africa
 Heliophanus maculatus Karsch, 1878 – New South Wales
 Heliophanus malus Wesołowska, 1986 – Syria, Israel
 Heliophanus maluti Wesołowska & Haddad, 2014 – Lesotho
 Heliophanus maralal Wesołowska, 2003 – Kenya
 Heliophanus marshalli Peckham & Peckham, 1903 – South Africa
 Heliophanus mauricianus Simon, 1901 – Mauritius, Réunion
 Heliophanus mediocinctus Kulczyński, 1898 – Austria
 Heliophanus megae Wesołowska, 2003 – Zimbabwe
 Heliophanus melinus L. Koch, 1867 – Palearctic
 Heliophanus menemeriformis Strand, 1907 – Tanzania
 Heliophanus minor Dawidowicz & Wesołowska, 2016 – Kenya
 Heliophanus minutissimus (Caporiacco, 1941) – Ethiopia
 Heliophanus mirabilis Wesołowska, 1986 – South Africa
 Heliophanus modicus Peckham & Peckham, 1903 – South Africa, Madagascar
 Heliophanus montanus Wesołowska, 2006 – Namibia
 Heliophanus mordax (O. P.-Cambridge, 1872) – Greece to Central Asia
 Heliophanus mucronatus Simon, 1901 – Madagascar
 Heliophanus nanus Wesołowska, 2003 – South Africa
 Heliophanus ndumoensis Wesołowska & Haddad, 2013 – South Africa
 Heliophanus nobilis Wesołowska, 1986 – Congo
 Heliophanus ochrichelis Strand, 1907 – Tanzania
 Heliophanus orchesta Simon, 1886 – Central, South Africa, Madagascar
 Heliophanus papyri Wesołowska, 2003 – Ethiopia
 Heliophanus parvus Wesołowska & van Harten, 1994 – Socotra
 Heliophanus patagiatus Thorell, 1875 – Palearctic
 Heliophanus patellaris Simon, 1901 – South Africa
 Heliophanus paulus Wesołowska, 1986 – Botswana
 Heliophanus pauper Wesołowska, 1986 – Ethiopia, Zambia, Kenya, Zimbabwe
 Heliophanus peckhami Simon, 1902 – South Africa
 Heliophanus pistaciae Wesołowska, 2003 – Zimbabwe, South Africa
 Heliophanus portentosus Wesołowska, 1986 – South Africa
 Heliophanus potanini Schenkel, 1963 – Afghanistan, Central Asia, Mongolia, China
 Heliophanus pratti Peckham & Peckham, 1903 – Namibia, South Africa
 Heliophanus proszynskii Wesołowska, 2003 – South Africa
 Heliophanus pygmaeus Wesołowska & Russell-Smith, 2000 – Senegal, Tanzania, Zimbabwe
 Heliophanus ramosus Wesołowska, 1986 – Algeria, Spain
 Heliophanus redimitus Simon, 1910 – South Africa
 Heliophanus robustus Berland & Millot, 1941 – Ivory Coast, Congo
 Heliophanus rufithorax Simon, 1868 – Southern Europe to Central Asia
 Heliophanus rutrosus Wesołowska, 2003 – Ethiopia
 Heliophanus saudis Prószynski, 1989 – Saudi Arabia, Yemen
 Heliophanus semirasus Lawrence, 1928 – Namibia
 Heliophanus similior Ledoux, 2007 – Réunion
 Heliophanus simplex Simon, 1868 – Palearctic
 Heliophanus sinaicus Logunov, 2015 – Egypt
 Heliophanus sororius Wesołowska, 2003 – South Africa
 Heliophanus splendidus Wesołowska, 2003 – Congo
 Heliophanus stylifer Simon, 1878 – Morocco, Algeria
 Heliophanus tenuitas Wesołowska, 2011 – Zimbabwe
 Heliophanus termitophagus Wesołowska & Haddad, 2002 – South Africa
 Heliophanus thaleri Wesołowska, 2009 – South Africa
 Heliophanus transvaalicus Simon, 1901 – South Africa
 Heliophanus transversus Wesołowska & Haddad, 2014 – Lesotho
 Heliophanus trepidus Simon, 1910 – Angola, Botswana, Namibia, South Africa
 Heliophanus tribulosus Simon, 1868 – Europe to Kazakhstan
 Heliophanus tristis Wesołowska, 2003 – Ethiopia
 Heliophanus turanicus Charitonov, 1969 – Central Asia
 Heliophanus undecimmaculatus Caporiacco, 1941 – East Africa
 Heliophanus ussuricus Kulczynski, 1895 – Russia, Mongolia, China, Korea, Japan
 Heliophanus uvirensis Wesołowska, 1986 – Congo
 Heliophanus validus Wesołowska, 1986 – Kenya
 Heliophanus variabilis (Vinson, 1863) – Reunion
 Heliophanus verus Wesołowska, 1986 – Iran, Azerbaijan
 Heliophanus wesolowskae Rakov & Logunov, 1997 – Central Asia
 Heliophanus wulingensis Peng & Xie, 1996 – China
 Heliophanus xanthopes Wesołowska, 2003 – Ethiopia
 Heliophanus xerxesi Logunov, 2009 – Iran

References

External links

 Photograph of H. aeneus 
 Photograph of H. flavipes 
 Photograph of H. kochii 
 Photograph of H. tribulosus 
 Photograph of H. cupreus
 Photograph of H. patagiatus 
 Photograph of H. parvus 
 Photograph of H. lineiventris 
 Photograph of H. dux 

Salticidae
Salticidae genera
Spiders of Africa
Spiders of Asia